The men's 100 metre freestyle event at the 1980 Summer Olympics was held on 26 and 27 July at the Swimming Pool at the Olimpiysky Sports Complex. There were 39 competitors from 26 nations. Nations had been limited to three swimmers each since the 1924 Games (except in 1960, when the limit was two). The event was won by Jörg Woithe of East Germany, the nation's first medal in the men's 100 metre freestyle. Sweden earned its first medals in the event since 1952 with Per Holmertz's silver and Per Johansson's bronze.

Background

This was the 18th appearance of the men's 100 metre freestyle. The event has been held at every Summer Olympics except 1900 (when the shortest freestyle was the 200 metres), though the 1904 version was measured in yards rather than metres.

None of the eight finalists from the 1976 Games returned. The top sprinters of the time were absent, Rowdy Gaines due to the American-led boycott and Jonty Skinner due to the ban on apartheid South Africa.

Algeria, Angola, Cyprus, Libya, Madagascar, Mozambique, and Zimbabwe each made their debut in the event. Great Britain and Hungary each made their 16th appearance, most of the nations competing in 1980, but behind the absent United States' 17 appearances.

Competition format

The competition used a three-round (heats, semifinals, final) format. The advancement rule followed the format introduced in 1952, though with 2 semifinals. Swim-offs were used as necessary to break ties. A swimmer's place in the heat was not used to determine advancement; instead, the fastest times from across all heats in a round were used. There were 6 heats, with between 6 and 8 swimmers each. The top 16 swimmers advanced to the semifinals. There were 2 semifinals of 8 swimmers each. The top 8 swimmers advanced to the final.

This swimming event used freestyle swimming, which means that the method of the stroke is not regulated (unlike backstroke, breaststroke, and butterfly events). Nearly all swimmers use the front crawl or a variant of that stroke. Because an Olympic size swimming pool is 50 metres long, this race consisted of two lengths of the pool.

Records

Prior to this competition, the existing world and Olympic records were as follows.

Schedule

All times are Moscow Time (UTC+3)

Results

Heats

Semifinals

Final

References

F
Men's events at the 1980 Summer Olympics